Tartu Art House is a building and art gallery in Tartu, Estonia. The house is managed by Tartu Artists' Union. Every year about 30 exhibitions take place.

As of about 2020, the house has three galleries: Big Gallery (172 m2), Small Gallery (57 m2) and Monumental Gallery (57 m2).

The building was erected in 1959.

References

External links
 

Buildings and structures in Tartu
Tartu
Art museums and galleries in Estonia